Duke of Estrées (Fr.: duc d'Estrées) was a title of nobility in the peerage of France that was created for François Annibal d'Estrées in 1663 by Louis XIV of France.  This title became extinct in 1771. In 1892, Alfonso XIII of Spain revived the title by granting it to Charles de La Rochefoucauld-Doudeauville, whose great grand mother was Bénigne Le Tellier de Louvois, sister to the last duke.

List of Dukes of Estrées, 1663—1771

List of Dukes of Estrées, 1892—Present

Claimants also include:

Pierre-Claude d'Estrée, Comte-Duc d'Estrées (1933 - 1985);
Claude Philippe d'Estrée, Comte-Duc d'Estrées (b. 1952)

References
 This page is based on this page on French Wikipedia.

1663 establishments in France